Schitt's Creek is a Canadian television sitcom that premiered on CBC Television on January 13, 2015. The series was created by Eugene Levy and Dan Levy and produced by Not a Real Company Productions. On January 12, 2015, CBC renewed the show for a second season, which premiered January 12, 2016, and consisted of 13 episodes. On February 17, 2016, the CBC announced that they renewed the show for a third season, and began broadcasting the third season on January 10, 2017. The fourth season began on January 9, 2018, in Canada and January 24 on Pop TV in the United States.

The series stars Eugene Levy and Catherine O'Hara as Johnny and Moira Rose, a wealthy couple who are forced, after losing all their money, to rebuild their lives in their only remaining asset: the small town of Schitt's Creek, which they once purchased as a joke, where they are living with their two adult children in two adjacent rooms of a rundown motel. The cast also includes Dan Levy, Annie Murphy, Chris Elliott, Jennifer Robertson and Emily Hampshire.

Over the course of the series, 80 episodes of Schitt's Creek aired in Canada and the United States. The final episode, airing April 7, 2020, received the highest ratings in the history of the program with 1.3 million viewers.

Series overview

Episodes

Season 1 (2015)

Season 2 (2016)

Season 3 (2017)

Season 4 (2018)

Season 5 (2019)

Season 6 (2020)

References

External links
 
 

Schitt's Creek

Lists of Canadian sitcom episodes